The 1996 PSA Men's World Open Squash Championship is the men's edition of the 1996 World Open, which serves as the individual world championship for squash players. The event took place in Lahore in Pakistan from 16 November to 22 November 1996. Jansher Khan won his eight World Open title, defeating Rodney Eyles in the final.

Seeds

Draw and results

Top half

Bottom half

See also
PSA World Open
1996 Women's World Open Squash Championship

References

External links
World Squash History

World Squash Championships
M
1996 in Pakistani sport
20th century in Lahore
Sport in Lahore
Squash tournaments in Pakistan
International sports competitions hosted by Pakistan